Phlox stansburyi is a species of phlox known by the common names cold-desert phlox and pink phlox. It is native to the southwestern United States from California to Utah to Texas, where it occurs in desert and plateau scrub and woodland habitat. 

It is a perennial herb taking an upright, branching form. The inflorescence bears one or more white to pink flowers with narrow, tubular throats which may exceed  in length. The base of the tube is encased in a calyx of keeled, ribbed sepals. The flower corolla is flat and five-lobed. In drier environments, the corolla-lobes may be narrower and curled, and the plant may be shorter or grow up through other shrubs.

References and external links

Jepson Manual Treatment
Photo gallery

North American desert flora
Flora of the Southwestern United States
stansburyi
Flora of North America